Portrait of the Abyss Within is the fifth album by Eldritch, released in 2004. It is the first album without keyboards, except for the bonus track "Quiet Hope".

Track listing
"Muddy Clepsidra" —1:05
"Forbidden" — 6:43
"The World Apart — 4:15
"This Everlasting Mind Disease" — 4:30
"Picture on The Wall" — 2:35
"Dice Rolling" — 5:52
"Drowning" — 3:51
"Blindfolded Walkthrough" — 6:18
"See You Down" — 5:06
"Slow Motion K Us" — 4:08
"Lonesome Existence" — 4:44

References
[] at Allmusic

2004 albums
Eldritch (band) albums
Limb Music albums